Grand Baton is an Afro-Caribbean, progressive rock and jazz fusion band based in New York City. The band was founded by the composer, arranger, guitarist, pianist, singer and songwriter Jean-Cristophe (JC) Maillard, a native of Pointe-à-Pitre, Guadeloupe.

Background 
Grand Baton, founded by Maillard in 2006, currently performs as a trio and consists of Maillard on vocals, guitar, keyboards and the SazBass, Thierry Arpino on drums and percussion, and Aidan Carroll on upright and electric bass.

The band has released two studio albums. Le Grand Baton was released in 2007 and Carnal Carnival in 2013.

Collaboration and touring 
In 2013, Grand Baton began its collaboration with the vocalist Lisa Fischer and Maillard serves as the band's musical director and arranger. Since beginning their tour in 2014, The Ms. Lisa Fischer and Grand Baton Tour has performed in North America, Europe, Asia, Australia and New Zealand.

Grand Baton and Fischer have also performed together at several jazz festivals including The Monterey Jazz Festival in 2014, The Newport Jazz Festival in 2015 and The New Orleans Jazz & Heritage Festival in 2017.

Grand Baton and Fischer collaborated with The Seattle Symphony in February 2018 for the musical program Just A Kiss Away in which rock and roll anthems including The Rolling Stone's "Gimme Shelter" and Led Zeppelin's "Rock and Roll" were recreated from an orchestral perspective.

Band members

2014 members 
In 2014, the line-up of Grand Baton was:

Former contributors/members 
The former members and/or contributors of Grand Baton include the following musicians:

Discography

Notes

References

External links

 Official website
 Album overview

American musical trios
Musical groups established in 2006
Musical groups from New York City
Funk rock musical groups
Rock music groups from New York (state)
Alternative rock groups from New York (state)